Özlem Zengin (born 9 September 1969) is a Turkish lawyer and politician.

She graduated from the Faculty of Law at Istanbul University in 1990. During her graduate years, she wrote for Teklif, a journal on law and actuality. After her graduation she lived in the United States for some time. She had a teaching position following her return. Between 1998 and 2001 she worked as a producer and speaker for the TV show Hayatın İçinden at the TV channel Kanal 7. In 2001 she founded IKAMER (Istanbul Woman and Family Research Centre) with her close friends. She also started working as a self-employed lawyer. In 2003 she was elected as a member of the AKP Istanbul Provincial Board. Since 2005 she has had the responsibility of promotion and media activities as a director. Until 2011, she worked as a member of the provincial board without any intervals.

Years later she returned to academic life. She completed her master's degree at Marmara University
Institute of Social Sciences in the area of Sociology of Religion. The title of her master's thesis was "Sociological Changes in the Perception of Religion and Secularism in the Light of Adjudication."

She also worked as a columnist for Yeni Akit newspaper. On 12 May 2012, during the Third Ordinary Istanbul Provincial Women's Branches Congress, she was elected as the Chairwoman of AKP Women's Branches. She is also a founding member of Beyaz El Solidarity Foundation.

She currently works in the Turkish parliament as a member of the Justice and Development Party (AKP).

References

Living people
Istanbul University Faculty of Law alumni
Turkish women lawyers
21st-century Turkish lawyers
1969 births
21st-century women lawyers
21st-century Turkish women politicians
21st-century Turkish politicians